Bill Hopkins (5 May 1928 – 6 May 2011) was a Welsh novelist and journalist who has been grouped with the angry young men. His father was Ted Hopkins, a popular stage performer; his mother was Violet Brodrick.

Hopkins's one published novel is a philosophical thriller, The Divine and the Decay (London, MacGibbon and Kee, 1957), also published as The Leap! In this story, the fate of Britain hangs in the balance. Political parties are jockeying for power. A recently formed political party, the New Britain Party, is led by a visionary firebrand, Peter Plowart, who has planned the assassination of his arch-rival, the leader of his own political party. As Plowart anticipates the assassination, he realises that he must establish an alibi to show that he was somewhere else when it comes to pass. After examining the statistical tables of a meticulously researched government census, he decides to make a journey to a little island off the coast of Britain (modelled on one of the smaller Channel Islands) and give a speech to the citizens there. If everything is timed properly, he can rely on the inhabitants vouching for his presence among them when the assassination takes place. His encounter with the islanders, however, leads him to question and test his "will power".

The novel received a negative response in various quarters. For example, Graham Hough of Encounter called it "an adolescent power-fantasy, extremely shoddily written" and expressed surprise that "even the naivest masturbations of the most unhappy young man should be able to take this openly Fascist form." The publisher voluntarily recalled all known copies of the work and had them destroyed, in response to such allegations that it contained fascistic themes. Surviving copies from the publisher's initial print run are rare and can command prices in three figures. The novel was reprinted in 1984 under the title The Leap!, with an introduction by Colin Wilson and a new preface by Hopkins.

Hopkins was also the author of "Ways Without Precedent", an essay included in Declaration, edited by Tom Maschler (London, MacGibbon & Kee, 1957), an anthology of non-fiction pieces by writers identified as Angry Young Men and Women. In "Aiming for a Likeness", his contribution to Colin Wilson: A Celebration (1988), he recalls how he arranged a meeting between Wilson and the portrait and fresco painter Pietro Annigoni.

In the mid-1980s, Hopkins edited and published The Monitor (originally titled The Arab Monitor), employing artist Cliff G. Hanley to design the covers. This was a news magazine focused on the Middle East.

Hopkins has been grouped with the authors Colin Wilson and Stuart Holroyd, with whom he shared a house in London in the late 1950s.

He was survived by his German-born wife, Carla Hopkins, who owns the antiques store they ran together for many years, and one of his sisters, Mary Angela Thomas, living in San Francisco, California, plus a nephew and niece.

References

External links 

  by Stewart Home.
 Photographs of Bill Hopkins by Ida Kar at the National Portrait Gallery site.

1928 births
2011 deaths
Welsh male novelists
British Poetry Revival
20th-century English poets
20th-century British novelists
Welsh male poets
20th-century English male writers
21st-century English male writers